Xuexiang National Forest Park, is a national forest park in Changting township, Hailin, Heilongjiang, China. The Xuexiang National Forest Park occupies a large area that includes both the China Snow Town and a vast underdeveloped forest preservation area that surrounds the central touristic town.

History
The national forest park is established in 1948.

It has been categorized as an AAAA level tourist site by the China National Tourism Administration.

Climate
Snow falls every October to April of next year.

Tourist attractions 
 China Snow Town Scenic Spot
 Primordial Forest Scenic Spot
 Hailang River Drifting Scenic Spot
 Lihuatun Scenic Spot
 Erlang River Scenic Spot
 Dream Home
 Farm House
 Xuexiang Film and Television Base
 Xuexiang Cultural Exhibition Hall
 Mount Yangcao
 Great Snow Valley
 Yaxue Post station

Film and Television
The China Snow Town, inside the Xuexiang National Forest Park, was used for location filming of the 2013 reality TV show Where Are We Going, Dad?.

See also
 List of protected areas of China

References

Parks in Heilongjiang
Mudanjiang